Fiji competed at the 2004 Summer Olympics in Athens, Greece, from 13 to 29 August 2004.

Archery 

One Fijian archer qualified for the men's individual archery through a tripartite invitation.

Athletics

Fijian athletes have so far achieved qualifying standards in the following athletics events (up to a maximum of 3 athletes in each event at the 'A' Standard, and 1 at the 'B' Standard).

Men

Women

Key
Note–Ranks given for track events are within the athlete's heat only
Q = Qualified for the next round
q = Qualified for the next round as a fastest loser or, in field events, by position without achieving the qualifying target
NR = National record
N/A = Round not applicable for the event
Bye = Athlete not required to compete in round

Judo

Two Fijian judoka qualified for the 2004 Summer Olympics.

Shooting 

Fiji has qualified a single shooter.

Men

Swimming 

Fijian swimmers earned qualifying standards in the following events (up to a maximum of 2 swimmers in each event at the A-standard time, and 1 at the B-standard time):

Men

Weightlifting 

Fiji has qualified a female weightlifter.

See also
 Fiji at the 2004 Summer Paralympics

References

External links
Official Report of the XXVIII Olympiad
Fiji Olympic Committee

Nations at the 2004 Summer Olympics
2004
Olympics